This page lists the results of leadership elections held by the Nova Scotia Liberal Party. Before 1930 leaders were chosen by the caucus.

1930 leadership convention

(Held on October 1, 1930)
Angus Lewis Macdonald 314
William Duff 110
John James Kinley 64
(Note: Conflicting accounts exist of Kinley receiving 62 votes)

Developments 1940–1945
Macdonald resigned in 1940 to enter the federal cabinet and was succeeded as premier and party leader by Alexander S. MacMillan on July 10 of that year. When MacMillan retired in 1945 Macdonald once again resumed the premiership.

1945 leadership convention

(Held on August 31, 1945)

Angus Lewis Macdonald acclaimed

Macdonald died on April 13, 1954 and the cabinet chose Harold Connolly to serve as interim leader and premier.

1954 leadership convention

(Held on September 9, 1954)

First Ballot:
Harold Connolly 216
Arthur W. Mackenzie 89
Henry Hicks 83
Ronald Fielding 69
Malcolm Patterson 54
Hector Hill 36

Second Ballot (Hill eliminated):
Harold Connolly 238
Henry Hicks 108
Arthur W. Mackenzie 106
Ronald Fielding 56
Malcolm Patterson 42

Third Ballot (Patterson eliminated):
Harold Connolly 229
Henry Hicks 178
Arthur W. Mackenzie 98
Ronald Fielding 33

Fourth Ballot (Fielding eliminated):
Henry Hicks 263
Harold Connolly 224
Arthur W. Mackenzie 54

Fifth Ballot (Mackenzie eliminated):
Henry Hicks 312
Harold Connolly 229

1962 leadership convention

(Held on November 3, 1962)

Earl Urquhart 314
Gordon S. Cowan 303

1965 leadership convention

(Held on July 24, 1965)

Gerald Regan 379
Robert Matheson 201
Arthur Yates 8

Colin Chisholm withdrew before balloting.

1980 leadership convention

(Held on June 8, 1980)

First Ballot:
Sandy Cameron 340
Vincent MacLean 244
Fraser Mooney 192
Ken MacInnis 138

Second Ballot (MacInnis eliminated):
Sandy Cameron 412
Vincent MacLean 317
Fraser Mooney 187

Third Ballot (Mooney eliminated):
Sandy Cameron 558
Vincent MacLean 356

1986 leadership convention

(Held on February 22, 1986)

Vincent MacLean 1082
Jim Cowan 721

1992 leadership convention

A one member one vote telephone election. The first attempt at voting on June 6, 1992 was canceled when the telephone system crashed during voting and the results were thrown out. The incomplete results of that cancelled ballot were:

John Savage 1721
Don Downe 1515
Ken MacInnis 546
John Drish 57
George Hawkins 39

A second, successful, vote was made on June 20, 1992.

First Ballot:
John Savage 3312
Don Downe 2832
Ken MacInnis 755
John Drish 60
George Hawkins 39

Second Ballot (Hawkins eliminated. Drish and MacInnis withdrew):
John Savage 3688
Don Downe 3311

1997 leadership convention

(Held on July 12, 1997)

First Ballot:
Russell MacLellan 4978
Bernie Boudreau 3235
Roseanne Skoke 1698
Bruce Holland 264

Second Ballot (Holland eliminated):
Russell MacLellan 5539
Bernie Boudreau 3148
Roseanne Skoke 1189

2002 leadership convention

(Held on April 13, 2002)

Danny Graham 6846
Francis MacKenzie 3855
Bruce Graham 835

2004 leadership convention

(Held on October 23, 2004)

Francis MacKenzie 5047
Richie Mann 2389

2007 leadership convention

(Held April 28, 2007)

First Ballot:
Stephen McNeil 571
Diana Whalen 402
Mike Smith 255
Kenzie MacKinnon 169

Second Ballot (MacKinnon eliminated and Smith withdrew. Both support Whalen):
Stephen McNeil 718
Diana Whalen 650

2021 leadership convention

(Held February 6, 2021)

The election was conducted on a One Member One Vote basis, weighted so that each electoral district being allocated 100 points, which were distributed proportionally according to each candidate's level of support.

First ballot (points)
Iain Rankin 2,206.00 (40.11%)
Labi Kousoulis 2,023.69 (36.79%)
Randy Delorey 1,270.31 (23.10%)

(Delorey Eliminated)

Second Ballot (points)
Iain Rankin 2,882.31 (52.41%)
Labi Kousoulis 2,617.69 (47.59%)

2022 leadership convention

(Held July 9, 2022)

The election was conducted on a One Member One Vote basis, weighted so that each electoral district being allocated 100 points, which were distributed proportionally according to each candidate's level of support.

First ballot (points)
Zach Churchill 3,580 (65.09%)
Angela Simmonds 1,920 (34.91%)

See also
Leadership convention
Nova Scotia Liberal Party

References
Beck, J. Murray, ‘’Politics of Nova Scotia’’, vol.2. Four East Publications, 1988.
Carty, Kenneth R et al., ‘’Leaders and Parties in Canadian Politics: Experiences of the Provinces’’. Harcourt Brace Jovanovich Canada, 1992.
Stewart,Ian and Stewart, David K., ‘’Conventional choices: Maritime leadership politics’’. University of British Columbia Press, 2007.

Liberal